The Coastal Museum in Sogn og Fjordane is a cultural history museum located in Florø, Norway.

The museum was established in 1980 and is a division of Museums of Sogn og Fjordane. The museum presents the natural and cultural conditions along the coast in the past and present. Its main buildings are located in a  museum and recreation area, and consist of a typical fisherman's home, an exhibition on the development of the village of Florø, and a large boat collection, which includes the Bakkejekta, a traditional mid-18th century sloop known as a jekt that was used as a coastal freighter. There are plans to develop an area presenting the settlements from the outer islands and along the fjord. The museum also has a large exhibition called Snorre-ankeret that presents the oil business in the North Sea, focusing on the newly created Snorre oil field. The museum also has smaller facilities in Gulen and Selje.

References

External links
Museum website

Culture in Sogn og Fjordane
Museums in Vestland
Museums established in 1980